NYC Resistor is a restricted membership private club hackerspace with 25 members in New York, inspired by Chaos Computer Club and other hacker organizations. The New York Times describes it as "kind of frat house for modern-day mad scientists." Its own website describes itself as "NYC Resistor is a hacker collective with a shared space located in downtown Brooklyn. We meet regularly to share knowledge, hack on projects together, and build community."

Membership
Membership costs $115 per month, or $75 for members who teach classes, and is by invitation.

Thursday's craft nights are open to the public and free. Classes are open to the public for a small fee.

Physical Space

Since 2011, NYC Resistor is located on 3rd Avenue in Boerum Hill, upstairs from the former Makerbot headquarters.
The industrial building houses a small kitchen, several shop tables, an epilog laser cutter, and a small machine shop.  Numerous electronics projects and personal tools litter shelves of members at the space.

Notable Projects 
 NYC Resistor was a finalist in Red Bull Creation 2011, submitting Nautilus Terrestrial, "a hand-pumped railroad cart slapped on top of a bicycle."

References

External links
 
 Hackerspaces.org

Computer clubs
Hackerspaces